Richard Dominic Mauti (born May 25, 1954) is a former American football wide receiver who played professionally in the National Football League (NFL) for the New Orleans Saints and the Washington Redskins. He played college football at Penn State.

In 6 seasons with the New Orleans Saints, Mauti, a reserve wide receiver, excelled as a special teams player. In 1978, he was named the Saints Special Teams MVP after setting an NFL record for special team tackles with 27 solo tackles and 4 assisted tackles for the year. In 1980, he was second in the NFL and first in the NFC in Average Return Yards on kickoffs and was named to the Pro Bowl as the NFC's Punt Returner.
Rich Mauti is also the founder of the Rich Mauti Cancer Fund, a voluntary, a 501c3 non-profit organization designed to raise money for cancer research, education and screenings, with all funds to be utilized in the State of Louisiana. While Mauti was playing for the Saints he started Mauti Challenge where businesses and individuals could pledge contributions to cancer research. Donations were $10 for every return and $1 for every yard from returns.

References

1954 births
Living people
American football wide receivers
New Orleans Saints players
Penn State Nittany Lions football players
Sportspeople from Queens, New York
Players of American football from New York City
Washington Redskins players
East Meadow High School alumni